George Bartlet  (13 November 1866 – 13 February 1951) was a Scottish  clergyman who was dean of Aberdeen and Orkney from 1934 to 1948.

Bartlet was born in 1866 in Forgue, Aberdeenshire, to George Bartlet and his wife, Isabella Cruickshank. He was educated at King's College, Aberdeen, graduating in 1893, and ordained in 1894. After  curacies in Ayr and Glasgow, he held  incumbencies  in Forgue, Folla Rule, and Aberdeen  prior to being elevated to canon in 1924,  a decade before his appointment as dean. In 1942, he became rector of Kincardine O'Neil, and retired six years later.

He died in Edinburgh in 1951 and was survived by his wife, Ethel Murray, and two sons and a daughter.

References

1866 births
1951 deaths
Alumni of the University of Aberdeen
Deans of Aberdeen and Orkney